In enzymology, a 7alpha-hydroxysteroid dehydrogenase is an enzyme that catalyzes the chemical reaction

3alpha,7alpha,12alpha-trihydroxy-5beta-cholanate + NAD+  3alpha,12alpha-dihydroxy-7-oxo-5beta-cholanate + NADH + H+

Thus, the two substrates of this enzyme are 3alpha,7alpha,12alpha-trihydroxy-5beta-cholanate and NAD+, whereas its 3 products are 3alpha,12alpha-dihydroxy-7-oxo-5beta-cholanate, NADH, and H+.

This enzyme belongs to the family of oxidoreductases, specifically those acting on the CH-OH group of donor with NAD+ or NADP+ as acceptor. The systematic name of this enzyme class is 7alpha-hydroxysteroid:NAD+ 7-oxidoreductase. Other names in common use include 7alpha-hydroxy steroid dehydrogenase, and 7alpha-HSDH.

Structural studies

References 

 
 
 
 

EC 1.1.1
NADH-dependent enzymes
Enzymes of known structure